Trumpets and Raspberries (Italian title: Clacson, trombette e pernacchi) is a satirical play by Dario Fo, first performed in 1981.

Plot summary
The fictional plot revolves around a real political figure, Gianni Agnelli, head of the Fiat corporation from 1966 to 2003. When Agnelli is disfigured in a failed kidnap attempt, he is rescued by Antonio, one of his Fiat employees. Antonio flees the scene when people start shooting at him, leaving his jacket on Agnelli's body. Agnelli is taken to hospital in Antonio's jacket, where he mistakenly has his face reconstructed in Antonio's likeness. Farcical confusion ensues.

List of characters
 Antonio Berardi / Gianni Agnelli (normally played by the same person)
 Rosa Berardi
 Lucia
 Police Inspector
 Magistrate
 Doctor
 Secret Agent Leader Fellini
 Policeman
 Man with Fridge
 Secret Agents / Orderlies
 Statue

Translations
Ed Emery has carried out an authorised English adaptation (Trumpets and Raspberries).

Ron Jenkins has carried out an authorised English adaptation (About Face).

A performance of the Kurdish language adaption of the play was banned by representatives of the Turkish Government due to the fact that the content of the play is deemed to support the Kurdistan Workers' Party (PKK).

Further reading

References

1981 plays
Plays by Dario Fo